The grey-bellied bulbul (Ixodia cyaniventris) is a species of songbird in the bulbul family.
It is found on the Malay Peninsula, Sumatra and Borneo.
Its natural habitat is subtropical or tropical moist lowland forests.
It is threatened by habitat loss.

Taxonomy and systematics
This species was previously placed in the large bulbul genus Pycnonotus, which was found to be polyphyletic in molecular phylogenetic studies, resulting in three species, including the grey-bellied bulbul, being moved to Ixodia.  Some authorities use Ixidia for the genus name because Ixodia was thought to be  preoccupied.

Subspecies
Two subspecies are recognized:

 I. c. cyaniventris - Blyth, 1842: Found on the Malay Peninsula and Sumatra
 I. c. paroticalis - (Sharpe, 1878): Originally described as a separate species. Found on Borneo

References

grey-bellied bulbul
Birds of Malesia
grey-bellied bulbul
grey-bellied bulbul
Taxonomy articles created by Polbot
Taxobox binomials not recognized by IUCN